This is a list of open-wheel single seater formula racing motorsport champions in the Formula Regional class. This list contains only those championships that operate using the vehicle regulations launched by the FIA Single Seater Commission in December 2017.

Series

Formula Regional Americas Championship

Formula Regional Asian Championship

Formula Regional European Championship

Formula Regional Japanese Championship

Formula Regional Middle East Championship

Formula Regional Oceania Championship

Formula Renault Eurocup

F3 Asian Championship

Toyota Racing Series

Ultimate Cup Series

W Series

References

champions
Formula Regional